Henning Jensen (17 August 1949 – 4 December 2017) was a Danish football player who played professionally for German club Borussia Mönchengladbach, Spanish club Real Madrid and Dutch club Ajax Amsterdam where he won the domestic league championship in each country. He scored nine goals in 21 games for the Denmark national football team from 1972 to 1980.

Biography

Born in Nørresundby, Jensen started playing football for local team Nørresundby BK in the Denmark Series, the then fourth best division of Danish football. Playing as a Right sided Attacker, he made his debut for the Danish national team in May 1972, and scored a goal in the 1972 Summer Olympics qualification match against Romania. Before having ever played a Danish league game, he moved abroad in 1972 as he signed a professional contract with German club Borussia Mönchengladbach.

At Mönchengladbach, he played alongside fellow Danish national team player Allan Simonsen in attack. He won the 1972–73 DFB-Pokal, 1974–75 UEFA Cup, and two Bundesliga championships in his four years at the club. After 44 goals in 125 league games, he earned a lucrative move to defending Spanish La Liga champions Real Madrid in 1976. He played three successful years at Real Madrid, winning the 1977–78 and 1978–79 La Liga championships. While in Madrid, he scored the 300th goal in the European competition for the club. He moved to the Netherlands in 1979, to play for defending Dutch Eredivisie champions Ajax Amsterdam of the coaches Cor Brom and Leo Beenhakker. He met in Amsterdam other Danish players like Frank Arnesen and Søren Lerby (and two years later also for a very short period Jesper Olsen). The routined player had to work hard for his position in the team for the first time at the age of 30 years. The midfielder had much rivalry from Frank Arnesen, Dick Schoenaker and Søren Lerby, which trio formed one of the strongest (attacking) midfields of Europe those years. Jensen started as centre forward, when central attacker Ray Clarke was sold. Thereafter he played at the wings, as wing attacker for a period. When Frank Arnesen had been injured a part of the 1979–80 season Jensen moved to the midfield, there playing his best matches for Ajax Amsterdam. In the season 1979–80 he won with Ajax the Dutch Eredivisie league championship and also the semi-finals of the European Cup tournament for champions were reached that season.

He returned to Denmark in July 1981, to play for AGF Aarhus, before he moved back to Nørresundby and played his last games for Nørresundby BK.

In 2006, Henning Jensen was named among the nominees for DBU's "Denmark's All-Time Best Footballer" award, alongside Preben Elkjær, Brian Laudrup, Michael Laudrup, Morten Olsen, Peter Schmeichel, Allan Simonsen and Jon Dahl Tomasson.

He died after a short illness from cancer.

Honours
 DFB-Pokal: 1972–73
 UEFA Cup: 1974–75
 Bundesliga: 1974–75 and 1975–76
 Spanish La Liga: 1977–78 and 1978–79
 Dutch Eredivisie: 1979–80

References

External links
Danish national team profile 
 

1949 births
2017 deaths
Danish men's footballers
Denmark international footballers
Nørresundby FB players
Borussia Mönchengladbach players
Real Madrid CF players
AFC Ajax players
Aarhus Gymnastikforening players
Danish Superliga players
Bundesliga players
La Liga players
Eredivisie players
Danish expatriate men's footballers
Danish expatriate sportspeople in West Germany
Expatriate footballers in West Germany
Danish expatriate sportspeople in Spain
Expatriate footballers in Spain
Danish expatriate sportspeople in the Netherlands
Expatriate footballers in the Netherlands
People from Nørresundby
Association football forwards
UEFA Cup winning players
Deaths from cancer in Denmark
Denmark Series players
Sportspeople from the North Jutland Region